Louis Gardel is a notable French novelist, screenwriter, and publisher, born in Algiers in 1939. He is also publishing director of Éditions du Seuil and a permanent member of the Prix Renaudot jury.

Bibliography 
 L'Été fracassé (1973)
 Couteau de chaleur (1976)
 Fort Saganne (1980) (Winner: Grand Prix du roman de l'Académie française 1980)
 Le Beau Rôle (1986)
 Notre homme (1987)
 Dar baroud (1993)
 L’Aurore des bien-aimés (1997)
 Grand Seigneur (1999)
 La Baie d'Alger (2007)

Screenplays 
Radetzky March (film) (1965) Director: Michael Kehlmann. Based on the novel by Joseph Roth 
Fort Saganne (1984) Director: Alain Corneau
Nocturne indien (1989) Director: Alain Corneau
Indochine (1992) Director: Régis Wargnier
East/West (1999) Director: Régis Wargnier
Himalaya, l’enfance d’un chef (1999) Director: Eric Valli

Notes and references

External links 
  Biography at the Prix Renaudot website
 

1939 births
Living people
20th-century French novelists
21st-century French novelists
French male screenwriters
French screenwriters
People from Algiers
Grand Prix du roman de l'Académie française winners
French male novelists
20th-century French male writers
21st-century French male writers